Stanley Thomas Pietkiewicz (born July 14, 1956) is a retired American professional basketball player. He had a brief career in the National Basketball Association.

Born in Huntsville, Alabama, Pietkiewicz was selected with the second pick of the seventh round in the 1978 NBA draft by the Buffalo Braves. In 1978, the Braves moved their franchise to California, and became the San Diego Clippers. Pietkiewicz was a member of the San Diego Clippers' inaugural roster, during the 1978–79 season. After signing two 10-day contracts with the Dallas Mavericks in 1981, he was signed for the remainder of the 1980–81 season, during which he played 36 games, averaging 3.9 points, 1.1 rebounds and 1.8 assists per game.

After his NBA career, Pietkiewicz played professionally in Italy.

In 2007, Stan Pietkiewicz's son John signed a letter of intent to play with the Flagler College men's basketball team in 2007–08.

References

External links

 College stats at Sports-Reference.com

1956 births
Living people
Alberta Dusters players
American expatriate basketball people in Canada
American expatriate basketball people in Italy
American men's basketball players
Anchorage Northern Knights players
Auburn Tigers men's basketball players
Basket Brescia Leonessa players
Basketball players from Alabama
Buffalo Braves draft picks
Dallas Mavericks players
San Diego Clippers players
Shooting guards
Sportspeople from Huntsville, Alabama
Victoria Libertas Pallacanestro players